ASLA may refer to:

 Academia de Științe, Literatură și Arte
 American Society of Landscape Architects
 Asla, Algeria, a municipality in Naâma Province

See also
 Əşlə, a village and municipality in the Lankaran Rayon of Azerbaijan